Biot is a small, bowl-shaped lunar impact crater located in the southern reaches of the Mare Fecunditatis. It is named after French astronomer Jean-Baptiste Biot. It is a circular formation with a sharp-edged rim that has not been significantly worn. The inner walls slope down to a relatively small interior floor. The albedo of the wide inner walls is higher than the surrounding lunar mare, giving it a light hue. To the southeast is the crater Wrottesley.

Satellite craters
By convention, these features are identified on lunar maps by placing the letter on the side of the crater midpoint that is closest to Biot.

References

External links

Impact craters on the Moon